Aseem Trivedi (born 17 February 1987) is an Indian political cartoonist and activist, known for his anti corruption campaign Cartoons Against Corruption. He is a founder member of Save Your Voice, a movement against internet censorship in India. He is the recipient of "Courage in Editorial Cartooning Award 2012" of US based Cartoonists Rights Network International.

Early life
Aseem Trivedi was born on 17 February 1987 in Shuklaganj at Unnao district of Uttar Pradesh State in India. He studied in Saraswati Vidya Mandir until 12th standard. He started his career as a freelance cartoonist and worked for several Hindi language newspapers and magazines.

Cartoons against corruption
In 2011, a nationwide anti corruption movement India Against Corruption gathered pace in India. Aseem Trivedi started a cartoon based campaign, Cartoons Against Corruption to support the movement. He launched a website www.cartoonsagainstcorruption.com and displayed his cartoons in the MMRDA ground, Mumbai during the hunger strike of Anna Hazare.

Ban on the website
The website was banned by Mumbai Crime Branch for displaying "defamatory and derogatory cartoons" in Dec, 2011. Following his website's ban, he uploaded his cartoons to a new blog.

Fight against internet censorship
After the ban on his website, Aseem Trivedi along with his friend Alok Dixit started Save Your Voice, a campaign for internet freedom. Through the creative protests in several cities, Save Your Voice, initiated a debate over internet freedom in India. The campaign was targeted at the draconian rules framed under the Information Technology Act, 2000.

Hunger Strike
Aseem Trivedi went on an indefinite hunger strike for internet freedom at Jantar Mantar, New Delhi. The motive of the hunger strike was to request political parties to support the annulment motion against the Intermediary Guideline Rules of the Information Technology Act 2011 of India.

Charges and allegations
One of Trivedi's cartoons showed the four lions that form Ashoka Chakra, India's national symbol, replaced by four wolves and the national slogan "truth shall prevail" replaced by "corruption shall prevail." Another cartoon showed Parliament as the "national toilet". He sketched a woman as "Mother India" being assaulted by a politician and a bureaucrat. A caption above this cartoon reads "gang rape of Mother India".

He faced serious allegations of insulting national emblem, Parliament, flag and constitution through his cartoons. He was charged with sedition IPC 124A, Section 66A of IT act and National Emblem Act 1971 . The case against him was filed in a Mumbai court by a lawyer, who said the pictures mocked national symbols. Trivedi was also charged with posting seditious and obscene content on his website.

Jail
He was arrested in Mumbai on 9 September 2012 on charges of sedition, related to the content of his work. He was granted bail with a personal bond of Rs. 5000 on the basis of an independent petition by a lawyer, who also asked the court to remove the accusations of sedition.

Sedition charges were dropped by the government in  October 2012. Section 66A of IT Act was scrapped by Supreme Court of India in March 2015.

Awards
He has been announced as the 2012 recipient of the "Courage in Editorial Cartooning Award" of Virginia based Cartoonists Rights Network International. He is sharing the award with Syrian cartoonist Ali Ferzat. Indian Affairs founded by Satya Brahma  in its 6th Annual India Leadership Conclave 2015 awarded Trivedi as "Cartoonist of the year 2015".

He was also nominated for the Freedom of Expression Awards 2013 in Arts category by UK based group Index on Censorship.

Reality television

As contestant

See also
 India Against Corruption
 Cartoons Against Corruption
 Save Your Voice
 Internet censorship in India

References

Living people
Indian cartoonists
1987 births
Indian anti-corruption activists
People from Kanpur
Activists from Uttar Pradesh
Writers from Uttarakhand
21st-century Indian non-fiction writers
Bigg Boss (Hindi TV series) contestants